Cleopus is a genus of true weevils in the subfamily Curculioninae.

References

External links 
 
 
 
 Cleopus at insectoid.info

Curculionidae genera
Curculioninae